Gasch is a surname. Notable people with the surname include:

Oliver Gasch (1906–1999), American judge
Uwe Gasch (born 1961), German rower